This is a list of members of the Australian House of Representatives from 1996 to 1998, as elected at the 1996 federal election.

 The Labor member for Blaxland, Paul Keating resigned before the swearing in of parliament, after losing the election and thus, the position of Prime Minister. The resulting by-election held on 15 June 1996 was won by Labor's Michael Hatton.
 The election of Jackie Kelly in Lindsay was declared invalid by the High Court of Australia, but she was subsequently re-elected in a by-election on 19 October 1996.
 Labor member John Langmore, member for Fraser, resigned. At the resulting by-election on 1 February 1997, Labor candidate Steve Dargavel was elected.
 Pauline Hanson, the member for Oxley, was elected as a Liberal, though she had been disendorsed during the campaign. She subsequently sat in Parliament as an independent, until forming her own party, One Nation, later in her term.
 John Bradford, member for the Gold Coast seat of McPherson, resigned from the Liberal Party in 1998 and joined the Christian Democratic Party, serving as their only representative in the parliament. He was defeated at the subsequent general election.
 Paul Zammit, member for the inner western Sydney seat of Lowe, resigned from the Liberal Party in 1998 over a dispute about Sydney Airport. He served the remainder of his term as an independent.
 Tony Smith, the member for Dickson, resigned from the Liberal Party in 1998 and sat as an independent.

References

Members of Australian parliaments by term
20th-century Australian politicians